Kenilworth is an unincorporated rural community in Wellington North Township, Wellington County, Ontario, Canada.  Kenilworth was located in Arthur Township until 1999.

A post office has operated continuously in Kenilworth since 1848.

History
Kenilworth is named for a pioneer storekeeper who immigrated from Kenilworth, England.

Many of the first settlers in Arthur Township were very poor, and moved here because the land was inexpensive.  Among them were a number of Irish Catholics, and some German Catholics.  Members of the Jesuit Order established the township's first Catholic church at Kenilworth in 1852.  The log church served whole township until 1857, when a Catholic church was established in the village of Arthur.  The Kenilworth church closed in 1870 after being condemned as structurally unsound.  In 1903, a Catholic church called Sacred Heart re-established in Kenilworth.

A Methodist church and cemetery were established in Kenilworth prior to 1854.  Called Ebenezer Church, it was built from logs, and was replaced in 1885 by a red brick church.  The congregation merged with the United Church in 1925.  Kenilworth United Church closed in 2001 and was demolished.  The cemetery also closed; the last inscription being from 2006.  A cairn was erected at the cemetery displaying a memorial plaque and the church's cornerstone.

By 1869, Kenilworth had a general store, tailor, doctor, saloon, wagon maker, hotel and post office.  The population was 50.

The Toronto, Grey and Bruce Railway established a line through Kenilworth in 1872.  Despite having a population at that time of just 75 people, Arthur Township made it conditional that in order to receive funding, the railway had to erect a station at Kenilworth.  The railway has since been abandoned and the tracks removed.

By 1910, Kenilworth had a bank and telegraph office, and a population of 100.  That same year, a steam boiler at a grist mill in Kenilworth exploded causing extensive damage.

The administrative offices of the Township of Wellington North are today located in Kenilworth.

Education
Kenilworth is served by the Upper Grand District School Board.  Kenilworth Public School is located at the settlement.

Notable people
 William Henry Cushing, Alberta's first Minister of Public Works and the 11th mayor of Calgary.
 Albert Hellyer, member of the Legislative Assembly of Ontario, representing the United Farmers of Ontario.  Uncle of Frank Prewett.
 Frank Prewett, poet.

References

Communities in Wellington County, Ontario